La Tribune is a French weekly financial newspaper founded in 1985 by Bruno Bertez. Its main competitor is the French newspaper Les Échos, which is currently owned by LVMH.

From 1993 to 2007, La Tribune was part of LVMH. In 2010, Alain Weill, the chairman and CEO of NextRadioTV, sold 80% of La Tribune to Valérie Decamp for €1 and he still owns 20%.

In 2000, it had a circulation of 531,000 copies. In 2008, it switched from tabloid to berliner format. It was rescued from bankruptcy in 2011. In 2012, the newspaper switched to a weekly.

In 2016, it launched its Africa focused website and monthly publication called La Tribune Afrique.

State aid
In 2003 and 2010, the newspaper received state subsidies in a sum of 2.53 million euros.

Former journalists

 Tariq Krim
 Jean Boissonnat
 Éric Fottorino
Guy-André Kieffer
Érik Izraelewicz
Pascal Riché

See also
 French newspapers
 Economics
Les Échos (France)

References

External links 
La Tribune official site
La Tribune official mobile site

1985 establishments in France
Business newspapers
Newspapers published in Paris
Weekly newspapers published in France
Publications established in 1985
LVMH